Suite for Late Summer is the 13th studio album by American singer-songwriter Dion. The album was released in 1972, by Warner Bros. Records.

Track listing
All tracks composed by Dion DiMucci and Bill Tuohy; except where indicated

Personnel
Dion DiMucci - lead vocals, guitar, harmonica
John Clausi - lead guitar
Sneaky Pete Kleinow - pedal steel guitar
George Terry - bass guitar
Nick DeCaro - organ, accordion, string arrangements
David Robinson - drums
Gary Coleman, Russ Titelman - percussion
Gene Parsons - tenor guitar on "Traveller in the Rain", harmony vocals on "Running Close Behind You"
Teri Bagby - backing vocals on "Soft Parade of Years"
Technical
Al Schmitt, Chuck Kirkpatrick, Lee Herschberg - engineer
Cal Schenkel - cover design
Joel Brodsky - photography

Charts

References

1972 albums
Dion DiMucci albums
Warner Records albums
Albums produced by Russ Titelman
albums with cover art by Joel Brodsky